The 1934 Philadelphia Phillies season was a season in Major League Baseball. The Phillies finished seventh in the National League with a record of 56 wins and 93 losses.

Offseason 
On April 14, 1934, the Phillies entered into an affiliation agreement with the New York–Penn League Hazelton Mountaineers. This was the first minor league affiliation for the Phillies.

Notable transactions 
 October 30, 1933: Jack Warner, a player to be named later, and cash were traded by the Phillies to the St. Paul Saints for Marty Hopkins. The Phillies completed the deal by sending Otto Bluege to the Saints on January 6, 1934.

Regular season

Season standings

Record vs. opponents

Notable transactions 
 May 10, 1934: Marty Hopkins was acquired from the Phillies by the St. Paul Saints.

Roster

Player stats

Batting

Starters by position 
Note: Pos = Position; G = Games played; AB = At bats; H = Hits; Avg. = Batting average; HR = Home runs; RBI = Runs batted in

Other batters 
Note: G = Games played; AB = At bats; H = Hits; Avg. = Batting average; HR = Home runs; RBI = Runs batted in

Pitching

Starting pitchers 
Note: G = Games pitched; IP = Innings pitched; W = Wins; L = Losses; ERA = Earned run average; SO = Strikeouts

Other pitchers 
Note: G = Games pitched; IP = Innings pitched; W = Wins; L = Losses; ERA = Earned run average; SO = Strikeouts

Relief pitchers 
Note: G = Games pitched; W = Wins; L = Losses; SV = Saves; ERA = Earned run average; SO = Strikeouts

Farm system

Notes

References 
1934 Philadelphia Phillies season at Baseball Reference

Philadelphia Phillies seasons
Philadelphia Phillies season
Philly